A stampede occurred on 17 February 1974 when fans were crushed before the kick-off of a football friendly match at the Zamalek Stadium in Cairo between Zamalek of Egypt and Dukla Prague of Czechoslovakia.

The total death toll is reported variously as 48, 49, or 50; 50 more were injured during this event.

Following a change of venue for the match, many supporters thought they would not be able to enter the newly chosen stadium, as the previously intended venue, Nasser Stadium, was much larger. There was a stampede, the walls crumbled, and many people were left dead.  According to reports, up to 80,000 people tried to access the stadium, despite the capacity at the time being just 40,000.

References 

Stadium disasters
1974 disasters in Egypt  
1974 in African football
1974 in Egypt
History of Cairo
Human stampedes in Africa
Man-made disasters in Egypt
Football in Egypt
Zamalek SC
Dukla Prague
1970s in Cairo
1973–74 in Czechoslovak football